Little River is a community in the Canadian province of Nova Scotia, located in The Municipality of the District of Digby. in Digby County on Digby Neck. Little River is a small fishing community located roughly 25 kilometers from Digby. Little River houses roughly 200 citizens.

References
 Little River on Destination Nova Scotia

Communities in Digby County, Nova Scotia
General Service Areas in Nova Scotia